Melissa Nobles (born May 13, 1963) is an American political scientist and academic administrator. She is currently Chancellor and Professor of Political Science at the Massachusetts Institute of Technology in Cambridge, Massachusetts. She previously served as the Kenan Sahin Dean of the MIT School of Humanities, Arts, and Social Sciences and Arthur and Ruth Sloan Professor of Political Science.

Nobles' scholarship focuses on the comparative study of racial politics, categorization, violence, and reconciliation.

Early life and education 
Melissa Nobles was born on May 13, 1963 at Sydenham Hospital in Harlem, New York City. Her mother was a social worker while her father worked as a police officer. Nobles' mother and father were raised South Carolina and Tennessee, respectively; both attended schools that were legally segregated on the basis of race.

Nobles was raised primarily in the Bronx; her family moved to New Rochelle, New York when she was in junior high. In high school, she was president of her school's Black culture club as well as class president.

Nobles majored in history at Brown University, where she earned a Bachelor of Arts in 1985. At Brown, Nobles became interested in the racial politics of Brazil. She completed a M.A. and Ph.D. in political science at Yale University under the direction of James C. Scott. Nobles' 1995 dissertation was titled, Responding with "Good Sense:" The Politics of Race and Censuses in Contemporary Brazil. After receiving her doctorate, Nobles held fellowships at the Boston University Institute for Race and Social Division and the Harvard Radcliffe Institute.

Career 
Nobles joined the faculty of MIT in 1999 as an associate professor of political science. She held the Cecil and Ida Green Career Development Professorship from 1997 to 2000 and was appointed the Arthur and Ruth Sloan Professorship in 2010. Between 2013 and 2015, Nobles headed the university's department of political science.

From 2013 to 2014, Nobles was vice-president of the American Political Science Association.

In 2015 Nobles was appointed Kenan Sahin Dean of the MIT School of Humanities, Arts, and Social Sciences, making her the first Black dean of MIT's academic schools.

Nobles was appointed the university's chancellor in 2021. She succeeded Cynthia Barnhart who served in the position from 2014 to 2021.

Selected works

References

External links

Living people
Place of birth missing (living people)
MIT School of Humanities, Arts, and Social Sciences faculty
21st-century American women writers
American women political scientists
American political scientists
African-American women academic administrators
African-American academic administrators
American university and college faculty deans
African-American political scientists
Brown University alumni
Yale Graduate School of Arts and Sciences alumni
21st-century African-American women writers
21st-century African-American writers
Women heads of universities and colleges
1963 births